Cerius is a genus of beetles belonging to the family Anthribidae.

The species of this genus are found in New Zealand.

Species:

Cerius otagensis 
Cerius triregius

References

Anthribidae